The Organic Statute of Macau (EOM) was a Portuguese organic law (Law No. 1/76) that provided for government in Portuguese Macau. Approved on 17 February 1976, the Portuguese legislation also reclassified Macau as a "Chinese territory under Portuguese administration" (território chinês sob administração portuguesa).

The organic statute was successively amended by Law No. 53/79 of 14 September 1979, Law No. 13/90 of 10 May 1990, and Law No. 23-A/96 of 29 July 1996.

On December 20, 1999, the organic statute ceased to have effect following the implementation of the Macau Basic Law, as the territory became a special administrative region of the People's Republic of China.

See also

 Portuguese Macau
 Hong Kong Royal Instructions (esp. the ones from 1917) and Hong Kong Letters Patent (esp. the ones from 1917), British Hong Kong equivalents

External links

 Original text of the Estatuto Orgânico de Macau
Law No. 53/79 of 14 September 1979
Law No. 13/90 of 10 May 1990
Law No. 23-A/96 of 29 July 1996

Politics of Macau
Macau law
Basic Law of Macau
1976 in law
Law of Portugal
Repealed Portuguese legislation
1976 establishments in Macau
1999 disestablishments in Macau
February 1976 events in Asia